Maggie Anderson (born 1948), is an American poet.

Maggie Anderson may also refer to:

People
Maggie Anderson (activist) (born 1971), American advocate of buying from businesses owned by African Americans

Fictional characters
Maggie Anderson, character in the musical play Brigadoon
Maggie Anderson, character in the film Day of the Wolves
Maggie Anderson, minor character in Read or Die  series of novels

See also
Margaret Anderson (disambiguation)